There are two rivers named Do Sal River or Rio do Sal in Brazil:

 Do Sal River (Goiás)
 Do Sal River (Sergipe)